The BDO World Trophy was a major darts tournament run by the British Darts Organisation, hosted originally in February 2014 at Blackpool Tower, before it was held in May from 2016–18 in various locations. In 2019, it was held in King George's Hall in Blackburn with a three-year contract for the event to be televised by Eurosport. The tournament was organized by BDO Events, the commercial arm of the British Darts Organisation.

History
The first World Trophy was held in February 2014 at the Tower Ballroom, Blackpool. The Event marked the first BDO major event since the split in darts to not feature the BDO World Champion as Stephen Bunting joined the Professional Darts Corporation once he won the Lakeside Championship in 2014.

Final Results and statistics

Finalists

Averages

Women's Championship

Averages

Sponsors
The tournament has been sponsored by the Daily Mirror, Winmau and SportsDirect.com. From 2019, the tournament's sponsors have been One80 and L-style

Media coverage
The BDO World Trophy was broadcast live and in its entirety by Eurosport for the first two events. After an issue with partner De:Luxe sports group the 2016 event ended up being shown on Dave in 2016. FrontRunner broadcast some of the 2017 event. A new TV channel has been found for the 2018 event when it was announced that Premier Sports will show all 5 days action. Eurosport showed the last edition of the World Trophy in 2019.

References

 
2014 establishments in the United Kingdom
2019 disestablishments in the United Kingdom
British Darts Organisation tournaments